Tagab is a village and the center of Tagab District (Kapisa Province), Afghanistan. The population in the village area was calculated to be  in the year 2007.

References

Populated places in Kapisa Province